Yalgoo was an electoral district of the Legislative Assembly in the Australian state of Western Australia from 1897 to 1901.

The district was located in the Western Australian outback. It existed for one term of parliament, and was represented in that time by independent member Frank Wallace.

In 1898, the district was based around the Mullewa–Meekatharra railway, including the towns of Mullewa, Pindar, and Yalgoo, as well as outlying farms and pastoral leases like Gabyon Station.

Members for Yalgoo

Election results

References

Yalgoo
1897 establishments in Australia
Constituencies established in 1897
1901 disestablishments in Australia
Constituencies disestablished in 1901